Thomas Welles Bartley (also known as Thomas W. Bartley) (February 11, 1812 – June 20, 1885) was an American Democratic politician from the U.S. state of Ohio. He served as the 17th governor of Ohio. Bartley was succeeded in office by his father, Mordecai Bartley, one of only a few instances of this occurring in high elected office in the United States.

Biography
Bartley was born in Jefferson County, Ohio. As a child he moved to Mansfield, Ohio with his family. Bartley attended Jefferson College and graduated in 1829. He studied law with Jacob Parker in Mansfield, Ohio, and studied law with Elijah Hayward in Washington, D.C.. Bartley was admitted to the bar in 1833, and began practice in Mansfield.

Career
Bartley served in the Ohio House of Representatives from 1839–1841 and then in the Ohio State Senate from 1841-1845. He was elected Speaker of the Senate in 1843.

When Wilson Shannon resigned as governor on April 15, 1844, to take a diplomatic appointment as United States ambassador to Mexico, 
Bartley became Governor while concurrently remaining in the Senate. He served out the remainder of Shannon's term until December 3. Bartley sought renomination under the Democratic Party, but lost at the state convention by a single vote - avoiding a contest against his father, who accepted the Whig nomination. Bartley later served a contentious term on the Ohio State Supreme Court from 1852-1859.

Bartley lived in Mansfield, Ohio, and moved to Cincinnati, Ohio to practice law in 1863, and in 1867 to Washington, D.C., where he died in 1885. He was interred at Glenwood Cemetery.

Family life

On October 9, 1837, Bartley married his first wife, Julia Maria Larwill, in Wooster, Ohio. Bartley married his second wife, Susan D. Sherman (October 10, 1825– January 10, 1876), sister of John Sherman and General William Tecumseh Sherman, on November 7, 1848,. Ellen McCoy, widow of one of General Sherman's staff officers, was his third wife.

Death
Bartley was buried at Glenwood Cemetery in Washington, D.C.

References

1812 births
1885 deaths
Democratic Party governors of Ohio
Democratic Party members of the Ohio House of Representatives
Presidents of the Ohio State Senate
Democratic Party Ohio state senators
Washington & Jefferson College alumni
Justices of the Ohio Supreme Court
Politicians from Mansfield, Ohio
Burials at Glenwood Cemetery (Washington, D.C.)
United States Attorneys for the District of Ohio
People from Jefferson County, Ohio
19th-century American politicians
19th-century American judges